London 1986 is a live album by the English group Talk Talk, released in Europe by Pond Life Records on compact disc in 1999.  It was recorded at the Hammersmith Odeon in London on 8 May 1986 near the end of their European tour to promote their 1986 studio album The Colour of Spring. This show was the band's last in the UK,  and the tour would be the band's final live performances, although they went on to release two more studio albums in 1988 and 1991. Promotional copies released in 1998 were titled  Hammersmith.

The album was met with moderately positive reviews upon its release. It is notable for capturing the band's transition period, when their sound was moving away from their earlier pop phase, from which the performances are mostly drawn, into their later experimental music.

The album is included in The Quietus' 2013 list of its writers' "40 Favourite Live Albums".

Cover art 
The cover artwork, by longtime collaborating artist James Marsh, was originally meant for a video documenting the same tour, and stills from the concert film, directed by Noel Oliver, are included in the album's liner notes. The international release was abandoned, however, and the video package only appeared in Italy. In 1990, one clip from the film, of the band performing "Give It Up", was included in the video album that accompanied the greatest-hits compilation Natural History: The Very Best of Talk Talk, and this was rereleased on DVD in 2007. The Hammersmith film has never been rereleased in its entirety. In 2008, the DVD Live at Montreux 1986 was released, consisting of the complete Montreux show from the same tour.

Track listing

Personnel 
Talk Talk
 Mark Hollis – lead vocals
 Paul Webb – bass, backing vocals
 Lee Harris – drums

Additional personnel
 David Rhodes – guitar, backing vocals
 Danny Cummings – percussion
 Phil Reis – percussion
 Ian Curnow – keyboards
 Rupert Black – piano
 Mark Feltham – harmonica

Production
 Chris Beale – live sound
 Tim Friese-Greene, Mick McKenna – original recorded sound
 Bill Leabody – production manager
 Barry Mead – tour manager
 Adrian Wiseman, Glenn Saggers, Hoagie Davies – crew
 Keith Aspden – management
 Phill Brown – mixing
 Denis Blackham at Country Masters – mastering
 James Marsh – front cover illustration
 Noel Oliver – film stills
 Cally at Antar – graphic design

References 

1999 live albums
Talk Talk albums
Albums recorded at the Hammersmith Apollo